The 1962–63 Oregon State Beavers men's basketball team represented Oregon State University in Corvallis, Oregon, during the 1962–63 season.

Led by head coach Slats Gill – serving in his 35th of 36 seasons – and big man Mel Counts, the Beavers participated in the 1963 NCAA Tournament and reached the second Final Four in school history.

Roster

Schedule and results

|-
!colspan=12 style=| Regular season

|-
!colspan=12 style=| NCAA Tournament

Sources

Rankings

Awards and honors
Mel Counts – All-American
Terry Baker – All-American, Academic All-American

References

Oregon State Beavers men's basketball seasons
Oregon State
NCAA Division I men's basketball tournament Final Four seasons
Oregon State
Oregon State
Oregon State